Valvatidae, the valve snails, is a taxonomic family of very small freshwater snails with an operculum, aquatic gastropod mollusks.

Taxonomy 
The family Valvatidae has no subfamilies (according to the taxonomy of the Gastropoda by Bouchet & Rocroi, 2005).

Genera 
The type genus of this family is Valvata O.F. Müller, 1774.

Genera in the family Valvatidae include:
 Andrussovia Brusina, 1903
 Borysthenia Lindholm, 1933
 Costovalvata Polinski, 1932
 Liratina Lindholm, 1906
 Megalovalvata Lindholm, 1906
 Valvata Müller, 1774
 Cincinna Hübner, 1810 - It is recognized either as genus of a subgenus of Valvata.

Ecology 
Snails in the family Valvatidae are useful for measuring water quality as biological indicators. According to the Biological monitoring working party they have a score of 3, which means that they have quite a high tolerance to pollutants.

References

Haszprunar G (2014) A nomenclator of extant and fossil taxa of the Valvatidae (Gastropoda, Ectobranchia). ZooKeys 377: 1-172. https://www.pensoft.net/J_FILES/1/articles/6032/6032-G-3-layout.pdf

Further reading 
 Hannibal H. (1910). Valvatidae of the Western North America. The Nautilus, page 104-107.

External links

 
Taxa named by John Edward Gray